Protein Wnt-3a is a protein that in humans is encoded by the WNT3A gene.

The WNT gene family consists of structurally related genes that encode secreted signaling proteins. These proteins have are critical in tissue homeostasis, embryonic development, and disease.

Signaling and Related Genes 
WNT3A is highly related to the WNT3 gene in sequence and protein function.  WNT3A and WNT3 signal similarly through primarily the beta-catenin/Tcf pathway.  WNT3A is located in the genome beside the WNT9A gene across many vertebrates. Similarly, the WNT3 gene occurs in the genome beside the WNT9B gene.  WNT9A and WNT9B signal through the beta-catenin/Tcf pathway but do not play related roles as WNT3A and WNT3 in the same cellular processes.

Role in Disease 
WNT3A is not linked to particular genetic disorder in humans.  Mice that have a genetic mutation in the WNT3A die during early embryogenesis and fail to correctly form axial tissues. Wnt-3a promotes the beta-catenin/Tcf pathway which is tumor inducing and can cause cancer when expressed in particular cell populations.

Role in embryonic development 
Embryonic development is the process where the body plan is created.  From studies in vertebrate model systems we can infer the roles of particular genes in human anatomical structures.  Wnt3a plays a role in these processes:

Body plan - Torso 
Wnt3A patterns a multipotent stem cell population that form neurons, muscles, bones, and cartilage of the torso region.  Wnt3a instructs these multipotent stems cells to form muscle, bone, and cartilage progenitors over forming neurons.  Wnt3A also regulates the Notch pathway to control the segmentation clock needed for normal torso development

Left-Right patterning 
Wnt3a is in a signaling pathway that activates the gene Nodal which is left side signaling determinant

Intestine - Colon 
The colon portion of the gastrointestinal tract is completely dependent on Wnt3a and Wnt3a selectively causes the growth of colon progenitors

Neural crest 
Wnt3a expands neural crest cells during early development

Blood cells 
Wnt3a promotes hematopoietic stem cell self-renewal.  Wnt3a is needed for myeloid but not B-lymphoid development at the progenitor level, and affected immature thymocyte differentiation

Brain - Hippocampus 
Wnt3a is needed for formation of the hippocampus portion of the brain

Teeth 
Wnt3a promotes stem cell properties of dental pulp stem cells

References

Further reading